M600 may refer to:

 Eten M600, a mobile telephone and PDA
 Noble M600, a handbuilt British supercar
 Orange M600, a mobile telephone and PDA
 Sony Ericsson M600, a mobile telephone
 M-600, the Syria-manufactured version of the Iranian Fateh-110 missile
 The Piper M600 single-engine light airplane